Kabui Naga may refer to:

Inpui Naga language
Rongmei Naga language